Vága can refer to a municipality in:
 Slovakia, see Váhovce (Vága in Hungarian)
 the Faroe Islands, see Vága kommuna